Thalassisobates littoralis  is a species of millipede found in coastal habitats on sand or shingle, often hidden under seaweed.

References

Julida
Animals described in 1903
Millipede genera